Flashmob is the second studio album by French Electronic music artist Vitalic. The album was released on 25 September 2009 through PIAS Recordings. In 2012 it was awarded a double silver certification from the Independent Music Companies Association which indicated sales of at least 40,000 copies throughout Europe.

Track listing

References

2009 albums
Vitalic albums